Action Express Racing (AXR) is a sports car racing team that currently competes in the IMSA WeatherTech SportsCar Championship. The team is owned by NASCAR CEO Jim France and run by Bob Johnson and former NASCAR champion crew chief Gary Nelson. Based in Denver, North Carolina, the team currently fields the No. 31 Whelen Engineering Cadillac V-LMDh for Jack Aitken, Pipo Derani and Alexander Sims.

History

Rolex Sports Car Series
Action Express Racing was founded in 2010 and ran in the former Rolex Sports Car Series. The team started out of the gate strong, by winning the 2010 Rolex 24 at Daytona. Their lineup in the No. 5 Riley Mk. XI featured João Barbosa, Terry Borcheller, Ryan Dalziel, and Audi LMP1 driver Mike Rockenfeller. The team's win was notable as their engine, a Porsche 5.0L V8 engine, was not sanctioned by Porsche itself, and was built by a third party based on the Porsche Cayenne. Full season drivers Barbosa and Borcheller were joined by J. C. France for a few rounds, but did not find the podium again, finishing 13th in points. Barbosa, Borcheller, and France reunited the following season, taking a podium at the 2011 Rolex 24 and winning at Virginia International Raceway, enough for Barbosa and France to finish 5th in points. The team also expanded to the No. 9 Riley-Porsche, driven by Darren Law, IndyCar driver Buddy Rice, David Donohue, and Burt Frissele. After reuniting Barbosa and France, the team opted to replace the latter with Law, scoring wins at Belle Isle and the 6 Hours of Watkins Glen.

For 2013, AXR fielded both the Nos. 5 and 9, this time as Corvette Daytona Prototypes. They were driven by Christian Fittipaldi, Brian Frissele, Barbosa and Burt Frissele, respectively. The team opted to join Barbosa and Fittipaldi together for the remained of the season after Road Atlanta, and the pair scored two wins at Mid-Ohio and Watkins Glen. While the Frissele brothers were teamed up, they only scored a single podium at Road America.

IMSA SportsCar Championship

Three straight championships (2014–2016)
For the newly formed IMSA SportsCar championship in 2014, AXR ran only the No. 5 of Barbosa and Fittipaldi for the full season, reducing the No. 9 crewed by the Frissele brothers and Jon Fogarty to only the North American Endurance Cup. AXR took three wins, including the team's second Rolex 24, en route to both the inaugural title and North American Endurance Cup for the No. 5. For 2015, AXR assumed operations of the No. 31 Whelen Racing team, hiring GTD champion Dane Cameron to pair with Eric Curran. The No. 5 took its second IMSA title as well as the NAEC on the back of two wins including the 12 Hours of Sebring and Petit Le Mans, while the No. 31 team won at Detroit and Road America to finish 3rd in points.

The No. 5 and No. 31 remained unchanged in 2016. With their worst finish being 6th and two wins at Canadian Tire Motorsports Park and Road America, the No. 31 Corvette team won the drivers title, with the No. 5 team taking home another North American Endurance Cup.

Cadillac partnership (2017–present)
From 2017, both Mustang Sampling Racing and Whelen Engineering Racing fielded Dallara-based Cadillac DPi-V.R machines. The Rolex 24 At Daytona saw the Mustang Sampling Cadillac knocked from the lead on the penultimate lap by Wayne Taylor Racing, another Cadillac team. Following the Daytona outing near-miss, the team continued to learn the new Cadillac Prototype as the No. 10 team had a strong start to the season. Mustang Sampling Racing returned to the winner circle at Watkins Glen and began to gain momentum. Even with both cars taking wins, compared to the last three seasons, had a relatively disappointing year, the Nos. 5 and 31 only winning one race each, and watched the rival Wayne Taylor Cadillac win the first five races on their way to the WeatherTech Championship, however the No. 5 once again took the NAEC, their fourth in a row.

2018 brought changes to the team. Christian Fittipaldi moved to an endurance driver/manager role in the team, while Dane Cameron left to join Team Penske's new Acura program. Their spots on the team were filled by Filipe Albuquerque and ex-F1 driver Felipe Nasr, respectively. The team started the 2018 season with a 1-2 finish at the Rolex 24, setting an all-time distance record. The Mustang Sampling car then won at Long Beach, with the Whelen Engineering Racing squad taking a victory at Detroit, and eventually capturing both the WSCC and NAEC for 2018.

For 2019, the Pipo Derani joins the team in the No. 31 from Extreme Speed Motorsports, filling a void left by Eric Curran's move to endurance driver role. Additionally, Christian Fittipaldi will leave the driver's seat as he finishes his transition to a management role following the 2019 Rolex 24 at Daytona.

In 2021, 7-time NASCAR Cup Series champion Jimmie Johnson joined the team in a brand new entry, the No. 48 Ally Cadillac Racing Cadillac DPi-V.R. Simon Pagenaud, Kamui Kobayashi and Mike Rockenfeller joined Johnson in the car, which finished 2nd at the Rolex 24 at Daytona. Johnson's former Hendrick teammate and defending NASCAR champion Chase Elliott joined the #31 Whelen Engineering Cadillac DPi-V.R team during the Rolex 24 at Daytona as well.

Racing results

Rolex Sports Car Series

Race wins

Rolex Sports Car Series wins

WeatherTech SportsCar Championship wins

References

External links
 Action Express Racing official website

American auto racing teams
WeatherTech SportsCar Championship teams
Auto racing teams established in 2010